The constitution of Quebec comprises a set of legal rules that arise from the following categories:

 The provisions of the Constitution Act, 1867 pertaining to the provinces of Canada in general and Quebec in particular;
 The organic laws regarding the distribution of powers of Quebec and the individual rights of persons: some fifteen Quebec laws, the main ones being An Act respecting the National Assembly, the Executive Power Act, the Election Act, the Referendum Act, the Charter of human rights and freedoms, the Charter of the French language, etc.;
 Most of the constitutional conventions concerned with the Crown of Canada, the Executive and the Parliament;
 The common law rules on the royal prerogative exercised by the Lieutenant Governor of Quebec;
 The constitutional case law of the courts of Quebec and the federal courts of Canada.

The Parliament of Quebec has the power to modify certain parts of Quebec's provincial constitution, while certain other parts can only be modified by going through the process of amending the Constitution of Canada.

Fundamental text 
Quebec has on several occasions discussed the possibility of gathering the scattered elements making up its constitution into a single text of law, but never went forward. During the 1969 National assizes of the Estates General of French Canada, the Quebec delegates adopted a resolution proposing that "Quebecers give themselves a written constitution."

More recently, in his speech before the 2007 congress of the Association québécoise de droit constitutionnel, former Liberal Quebec Minister of Canadian Intergovernmental Affairs Benoît Pelletier stated:

"One of the first questions to answer naturally pertains to the content of a future fundamental text of law which Quebec could adopt. In 2001, the committee I chaired listed some possible elements for a consolidation of the fundamental rules governing Quebec. Generally speaking, our committee suggested that such a document could contain all the elements, currently dispersed, which form the material constitution of Quebec."

This "material constitution" could include, according to Pelletier:

 the set of constitutional and legislative provisions relating to the organization of the National Assembly and the Government of Quebec contained in sections 58–90 of the Constitution Act, 1867, in the National Assembly Act and in the Executive Act;
 the Charter of human rights and freedoms;
 the Charter of the French language;
 the Act respecting the Ministère des Relations internationales;
 the Election Act and the Referendum Act;
 some elements of the Act respecting the exercise of the fundamental rights and prerogatives of the Québec people and the Québec State;
 some motions and declarations adopted by the National Assembly that pertain to fundamental questions, such as the recognition of the rights of the Aboriginal peoples in Quebec.

On October 18, 2007, constitutional law professor and Parti Québécois opposition MNA Daniel Turp introduced Bill 196, a proposed Quebec Constitution, into the National Assembly. The bill did not pass the first reading.

Notes

References 
  Benoît Pelletier. "La nature quasi constitutionnelle de la Charte des droits et libertés de la personne du Québec et l’idée d’une constitution québécoise", in Bulletin québécois de droit constitutionnel, issue 2, Winter 2007.
  André Tremblay. Droit constitutionnel canadien et québécois. (volume I), Éditions Thémis, 2000, 679 p.
 André Tremblay. Droit constitutionnel canadien et québécois. Documents (volume II), Éditions Thémis, 2000, 679 p.
  Jacques-Yvan Morin, José Woehrling. Les constitutions du Canada et du Québec: du régime français à nos jours. Tome premier. Études, Éditions Thémis, 1992, 978 p. 
  Jacques-Yvan Morin, José Woehrling, Les constitutions du Canada et du Québec: du régime français à nos jours. Tome deuxième. Recueil de textes, Éditions Thémis, 1994, 656 p.

External links 

Canadian Constitutional Documents (Constitution Acts, 1867 to 1982)

Quebec law
Quebec